Caenisomopsis is a genus of tachinid flies in the family Tachinidae.

Species
Caenisomopsis paraensis Townsend, 1934

Distribution
Brazil.

References

Exoristinae
Diptera of South America
Tachinidae genera
Taxa named by Charles Henry Tyler Townsend
Monotypic Brachycera genera